Hedgebrook is an American publicly traded company listed on the OTC Bulletin Board and headquartered in Ashland, Oregon that focuses on mergers and acquisitions in various industries, including aerospace, consumer, energy and health care. The company was founded in 2004, and is chaired by Brady Brim-DeForest.

See also
 List of companies based in Oregon

References

External links
 

2004 establishments in Oregon
Companies based in Ashland, Oregon
American companies established in 2004
Holding companies established in 2004